Dokkan Shehata (Shehata shop) is an Egyptian drama film produced in 2009.  The main actors in this film are Muhammad Hamidah, 'Umaru Sa'ad, Ghadah 'Abd Al-Raziq, Haifa Wehbe, 'Umru 'Abd Al-Jalil, Tariq 'Abd Al-'Aziz, and 'Abd Al-Aziz Makhyoun.  The film was produced by Khaled Youssef.

Controversy
Khalid Youssef alleged that there was a dirty plot to limit the film's financial success. Despite getting financial success in theatres, many of them withdrew Dokkan Shehata, supposedly to show other films such as Al-Farah (The Wedding Party) and Bobbos. He alleges theatrical distribution tycoons are responsible for "killing" it. The film also was reported by a number of commentators to have predicted the Egyptian revolution of 2011

Reception

Box office 
In the first three weeks after its release, Dokkan Shehata grossed  in revenues. It was second to Omar & Salma starring Tamer Hosny and Mai Ezzeddine, which grossed .

References

External links

2009 films
2000s Arabic-language films
2009 drama films
Films set in Egypt
Egyptian drama films